Thrall may refer to:
 Thrall, a slave in Scandinavian culture during the Viking Age
 The human son of Ríg (Norse god).
 Enchantment, the state of being under a magical spell of obedience
 Thrall (Warcraft), a fictional character in the Warcraft franchise and Heroes of the Storm
 Destiny 2, Thrall are the most common morph of Hive

Thrall may also refer to:
 Thrall, Kansas
 Thrall, Texas
 Battle Thralls is the term given to races that have chosen to serve the Ur-Quan in the Star Control computer games
 A unit in the computer game Trash
 An undead unit in the strategy computer game Myth video game series
 An undead follower of King Palawa Joko in the game  Guild Wars
 Thrall-Noldorin, beings in the works of J. R. R. Tolkien
 Thrall-Demonsweatlive, an EP by Danzig
 Thrall Car Manufacturing Company
 Thrall (metal band), a black metal band from Tasmania

Surname
 Danica Thrall (b. 1988), English glamour model.
 Margaret Thrall (1928–2010), Welsh theologian, academic, and Anglican priest.
 Robert M. Thrall (1914–2006), American mathematician and operations researcher.

See also
 Thralls (film), a 2004 horror film